Alper Balaban (August 1, 1987  – April 12, 2010) was a Turkish-German footballer who started his career with  Fenerbahçe.

Balaban was raised in Gemmingen and Heilbronn. He began his career with German club TSG 1899 Hoffenheim. In 2005, he was transferred to Fenerbahçe. He made his debut in a Turkish Cup match against Sivasspor on November 11, 2006, and was brought on in the 82nd minute.

Balaban played 58 times for Fenerbahçe PAF and scored 16 goals.

On April 5, 2010, he was involved in a car accident in Bretten, Germany, and died seven days later on April 12, 2010.

References

1987 births
2010 deaths
Footballers from Karlsruhe
German footballers
Turkish footballers
Turkey under-21 international footballers
German people of Turkish descent
TSG 1899 Hoffenheim players
Fenerbahçe S.K. footballers
Kocaelispor footballers
Süper Lig players
Association football forwards
Road incident deaths in Germany